The 187th Paratroopers Regiment "Folgore" is an active unit of the Italian Army based in Livorno in Tuscany. The regiment is part of the Italian Army's infantry arm's Paracadutisti speciality and assigned to the Paratroopers Brigade "Folgore".

The regiment was the third Italian paratroopers regiment to be formed. The regiment was assigned to the Paratroopers Division, which was intended to parachute onto Malta during the planned invasion of Malta. When the invasion was canceled the division was sent in September 1942 as reinforcement for the German-Italian Panzer Army Africa to North Africa. There the division and regiment were destroyed in November 1942 during the Second Battle of El Alamein. For its conduct at El Alamein the regiment was awarded Italy's highest military honor the Gold Medal of Military Valour. In 1975 the regiment was reformed as a battalion sized unit. In 1992 regiment was reformed.

History

Formation 
On 4 October 1941 the General Staff of the Royal Italian Army issued an order form the command of the 3rd Paratroopers Regiment, which would then move to Libya and take command of the I Carabinieri Paratroopers Battalion and the Libyan Paratroopers Battalion there. After the command had been formed the order to move to North Africa was canceled and the command was assigned on 1 January 1942 to the Paratroopers Division, which was planned to participate in the proposed invasion of Malta. On 15 March 1942 the regiment was formed in Pisa with the VIII, IX, and X paratrooper battalions and the 3rd Cannons Company, which was equipped with 47/32 anti-tank guns.

In May 1942 the VIII Paratroopers Battalion left the regiment to become the VIII Paratroopers Sappers Battalion. As replacement the regiment received the XI Paratroopers Battalion, which was being formed at the Royal Italian Air Force's Paratroopers School in Tarquinia.

World War II 

In July 1942 the invasion of Malta was postponed indefinitely and after the First Battle of El Alamein the General Staff of the Royal Italian Army decided to sent the Paratroopers Division to Libya as reinforcements for the depleted German-Italian Panzer Army Africa. As the division would be deployed as infantry it was renamed on 27 July 1942 185th Infantry Division "Folgore". On the same date the 3rd Paratroopers Regiment was renamed 187th Infantry Regiment "Folgore". Before departing for North Africa the regiment ceded the not yet fully trained XI Paratroopers Battalion to the 185th Infantry Regiment "Folgore", and received from that regiment the II and IV paratrooper battalions in return. The regiment consisted now of the following units:

 187th Infantry Regiment "Folgore"
 II Paratroopers Battalion
 4th, 5th, and 6th Company
 IV Paratroopers Battalion
 10th, 11th, and 12th Company
 IX Paratroopers Battalion
 25th, 26th, and 27th Company
 X Paratroopers Battalion
 28th, 29th, and 30th Company
 187th Cannons Company (with 47/32 anti-tank guns)

After arriving in North Africa the division was sent to the extreme South of the Axis line at El Alamein between Deir el Munassib and Qaret el Himeimat, where the Qattara Depression began. From 30 August to 5 September 1942 the division participated in the unsuccessful Axis attempt to outflank the British Eighth Army at El Alamein in the Battle of Alam el Halfa.

On 29 September 1942 the British launched Operation Braganza against the paratroopers of the Folgore, who despite numerical inferiority managed to repulse the British attack. Due to the losses suffered by the IX and X paratrooper battalions during Operation Braganza the X Paratroopers Battalion was disbanded and its personnel assigned to the IX Paratroopers Battalion.

On 23 October 1942 the Second Battle of El Alamein began and on 25 October the British launched an all out attack by three British divisions and a Free French Brigade against the Folgore's positions. The attack was repulsed by 3am of 26 October.

When the Folgore received the order to abandon its positions and retreat westwards on 2 November 1942 none of the division's positions had been lost to the British. The division began its retreat during the night of 2 to 3 November 1942, leaving behind 1,100 dead. During the retreat the division formed the Axis' rearguard. On 6 November the remnants of the division were overtaken and surrounded by motorized British forces and forced to surrendered. On 25 November 1942 the division was declared lost due to wartime events.

The few survivors who managed to escape were organized into the CCLXXXV Paratroopers Battalion "Folgore", which fought in the Tunisian Campaign on the Mareth Line and was destroyed during the Battle of Takrouna on 20-21 April 1943.

For their conduct and sacrifices during the Western Desert Campaign and at El Alamein the three regiments of the 185th Infantry Division "Folgore" were awarded Italy's highest military honor, the Gold Medal of Military Valour.

Cold War 

In 1952 the Military Parachuting Center in Pisa formed a paratroopers battalion, which then expanded to become the 1st Paratroopers Tactical Group, which consisted of the II Paratroopers Battalion and V Paratroopers Battalion. On 1 January 1963 the two battalions were assigned to the reformed 1st Paratroopers Regiment. On the same date the regiment was assigned to the newly formed Paratroopers Brigade, which on 10 June 1967 was renamed Paratroopers Brigade "Folgore".

During the 1975 army reform the Italian Army disbanded the regimental level and newly independent battalions were granted for the first time their own flags. On 30 September 1975 the 1st Paratroopers Regiment was disbanded and its two battalions became autonomous units: the II Paratroopers Battalion was renamed 2nd Paratroopers Battalion "Tarquinia" and assigned the flag and traditions of the 187th Infantry Regiment "Folgore", while the V Paratroopers Battalion was renamed 5th Paratroopers Battalion "El Alamein" and assigned the flag and traditions of the 186th Infantry Regiment "Folgore". The two battalions moved from Pisa to Livorno, but remained assigned to the Paratroopers Brigade "Folgore". Both battalions consisted of a command, a command and services company, three paratroopers companies, and a heavy mortar company with towed 120mm Mod. 63 mortars.

In 1981 the battalion formed the 10th Paratroopers Company and now consisted of four paratrooper companies.

Recent times 
On 8 October 1992 the 2nd Paratroopers Battalion "Tarquinia" lost its autonomy and the next day the battalion entered the reformed 187th Paratroopers Regiment "Folgore". From 27 December 1992 to 8 June 1993 the regiment was deployed to Somalia for the American-led Unified Task Force. After the regiment's return to Italy it was awarded a Silver Medal of Army Valour for its conduct in Somalia.

From 3 July 1996 to 24 March 1997 the regiment was deployed to Bosnia and Herzegovina, where the regiment was initially assigned to the NATO-led Implementation Force and then to the NATO-led Stabilisation Force in Bosnia and Herzegovina. After the regiment's return to Italy it was awarded a Silver Medal of Army Valour for its conduct in Somalia.

From 3 April to 20 October 2009 the regiment was deployed to Afghanistan for the NATO-led International Security Assistance Force. After the regiment's return to Italy it was awarded a Bronze Medal of Army Valour for its conduct in Afghanistan.

Current structure 
As of 2023 the 187th Paratroopers Regiment "Folgore" consists of:

  Regimental Command, in Livorno
 Command and Logistic Support Company "Aquile"
 2nd Paratroopers Battalion "Tarquinia"
 4th Paratroopers Company "Falchi"
 5th Paratroopers Company "Pipistrelli"
 6th Paratroopers Company "Grifi"
 10th Paratroopers Maneuver Support Company "Draghi"

The Command and Logistic Support Company fields the following platoons: C3 Platoon, Transport and Materiel Platoon, Medical Platoon, and Commissariat Platoon. The regiment is equipped with VTLM Lince vehicles. The 10th Paratroopers Maneuver Support Company is equipped with 120mm mortars and Spike MR anti-tank guided missiles.

See also 
 Paratroopers Brigade "Folgore"

External links
 Italian Army Website: 187th Paratroopers Regiment "Folgore"

References

Paracadutisti Regiments of Italy